Soyuz 10 (Union 10) was launched on 22 April 1971 as the world's first mission to the world's first space station, the Soviet Salyut 1. The docking was not successful and the crew, Vladimir Shatalov, Aleksei Yeliseyev, and Nikolai Rukavishnikov, returned to Earth without having entered the station. Following difficulties in docking pairs of Soyuz capsules, this would be the first of numerous docking failures in the Soviet space station program.

Spacecraft 
The spacecraft was the first of the upgraded Soyuz 7K-OKS, featuring the new "probe and drogue" docking mechanism with internal crew transfer capability, intended for space station visits.

Mission 
The cosmonauts Vladimir Shatalov, Aleksei Yeliseyev, and Nikolai Rukavishnikov were able to navigate their Soyuz 10 spacecraft to the Salyut 1 station, yet during docking they ran into problems. The automatic control system failed during approach, owing to a serious design oversight. Soft dock (contact between the spacecraft and station without a full link) was achieved on 24 April 1971 at 01:47 GMT, but the computer sensed an abnormality in the spacecraft's alignment and began firing the attitude control jets to compensate. With Soyuz 10 being pushed to one side by the attitude control system, it became impossible to achieve hard dock, and large quantities of propellant were expended doing so. The docking attempt was called off, but further difficulty occurred when the probe would not come out of the space station's docking cone. The obvious solution was simply to jettison the orbital module and leave it attached to Salyut 1, but this would make it impossible for future Soyuz missions to dock; thus, the space station would have to be abandoned. Eventually, ground controllers realised that the cosmonauts could throw a circuit breaker in the docking mechanism, for interrupting the power supply, which would cause the probe to automatically retract. This procedure worked, and undocking was completed and the capsule returned to Earth later on 24 April 1971 at 23:40 GMT. The automatic control system would be redesigned on future Soyuz spacecraft.

Crew

Backup crew

Reserve crew

Mission parameters 
 Mass:  
 Perigee:  
 Apogee: 
 Inclination: 51.6°
 Period: 89.0 minutes

Return 
Retrorockets were fired at the first opportunity after undocking to permit return to Earth. One last hitch presented itself when toxic fumes began to fill the capsule during reentry, causing Rukavishnikov to pass out; however, all three crew members were recovered unscathed. The landing at 120 km to the northeast of Karaganda, Kazakhstan, the first night-time landing of a crewed spacecraft, was a success.

See also 

 Soyuz T-13, a mission to manually dock to the crippled Salyut 7 space station
 Soyuz T-15, a mission to ferry equipment from Salyut 7 to Mir, which had to manually maneuver and dock to Mir

References 

Crewed Soyuz missions
1971 in spaceflight
1971 in the Soviet Union
Spacecraft launched in 1971
Spacecraft which reentered in 1971